The 2017–18 SVB Cup was the 27th season of the Surinamese Cup. The competition began on 6 January and ended on 30 June 2018. 

Robinhood beat West United in the final, 7–1, earning themselves their seventh SVB Cup, and their first since 2016.

Bracket

Results

Qualifying round

First round 
31 clubs enter, winner of qualifying round enters.

Second round

Quarterfinals

Semifinals

Final

See also 
 2017–18 SVB Topklasse

Notes

References 

 

SVB Cup
1
Surinam